Blagoje Nešković (11 February 1907, in Kragujevac – 11 November 1984, in Belgrade) was a Yugoslav communist politician and Doctor of Medicine in Spanish Civil War who served as the first Secretary of the Central Committee of the Communist Party of Serbia.

See also
Cabinet of Blagoje Nešković (1945-1946)

References

1907 births
1984 deaths
Politicians from Kragujevac
Prime Ministers of Serbia
Serbian communists
League of Communists of Serbia politicians
Yugoslav military doctors